

Public holidays
Public holidays in Vietnam are days when workers get the day off work.  Prior to 2007, Vietnamese workers observed 8 days of public holiday a year, among the lowest in the region. On 28 March 2007 the government added the traditional holiday commemorating the mythical Hùng kings to its list of public holidays, increasing the number of days to 10.  As in most other nations, if a holiday falls during the weekend, it is observed on the following Monday.

Other holidays and festivals
There are also many other holidays and festivals that are held in Vietnam either nationally or locally. These holidays and festivals do not involve days off but are widely observed and celebrated across the country.

Gregorian calendar

Vietnamese calendar (Âm lịch Việt Nam)

References

 
Vietnam
Vietnamese culture
Holidays